Lewis John Strapp (born 26 November 1999) is a Scottish professional footballer who plays as a left-sided defender for Greenock Morton.

Club career
Strapp joined the Greenock Morton youth academy on its inception in 2012, before signing professional forms shortly after his 16th birthday.

Strapp made his debut for Morton in a Scottish League Cup tie against Albion Rovers in July 2016. He joined Elgin City on loan in August 2017 until January 2018.

In June 2018, Strapp signed with Morton for another season.

In late September 2018, Strapp and team-mate Ruaridh Langan joined Annan Athletic on a short-term development loan.

Strapp scored his first league goal for Morton with the late winner against Ayr United on Halloween 2020; he also opened the scoring with an own goal in the 32nd minute.

Strapp would go on to regularly feature for Morton, making his 100th appearance for the club in a 5-0 home win against Dunfermline Athletic. Strapp also scored his second career goal in a 0-1 away win against Inverness a few weeks later. Following much speculation about a potential move away from Morton, Strapp signed a 1 year contract extension, expiring in summer 2023.

Career statistics

Honours
SPFL Development League West: Winners (2) 2015-16, 2017-18

References

External links

1999 births
Annan Athletic F.C. players
Association football defenders
Elgin City F.C. players
Greenock Morton F.C. players
Living people
People from Dunoon
Scottish footballers
Scottish Professional Football League players
Sportspeople from Argyll and Bute